"Se Puede Amar" ("You Can Love") is a song recorded by Spanish singer-songwriter Pablo Alborán. The song was released worldwide on 22 April 2016  and peaked at number 6 in Spain; thus becoming Alborán's twelfth top ten single in Spain.

At the 17th Annual Latin Grammy Awards the song has been nominated for Latin Grammy Award for Record of the Year.

The song is the main theme of the Mexican telenovela Tres veces Ana.

Chart performance

Awards and nominations

References 

2016 singles
Pablo Alborán songs
Songs written by Pablo Alborán
2016 songs
Warner Music Spain singles